Battle Trip is a South Korean television entertainment program, distributed and syndicated by KBS.

Season 1 was aired starting 16 April 2016 and ended on 3 April 2020 with 177 episodes and 4 special episodes. The program starred Kim Sook, Kim Jun-hyun, Yoon Bo-mi of Apink, Lee Hwi-jae, Sung Si-kyung and San E as the main MCs. An invited celebrity will work together with the cast as a special MC to host the show.

Season 2 started on 15 October 2022, starring Sung Si-kyung, Lee Yong-jin, Heo Kyung-hwan and Lee Mi-joo after 30 months of hiatus. As follow with the first season, an invited celebrity will work together with the cast as a special MC to host the show.

Overview

Season 1

Episode 1 to 158
The program is a trip competition between two groups of celebrities or several individual celebrities, travelling based on specific topics and showing viewers travel information and amazing tips. The winner is chosen based on 100 votes from the audience. To discourage cross-country travels, each group can only travel within specified cities or states as the topic stipulates.

Episode 159 to 177
The program is revamped and the new concept focuses on the relationship between the selected destination and the guests. There will not have popularity votes from the audience of 100 and a new studio setting is used to film the program.

End of Season 1
On 6 February 2020, it was initially announced to have its final airing of the program on 27 March 2020. Between 6 and 27 March 2020, repeat telecast of previous episodes were used due to the COVID-19 pandemic, which made travelling and filming for the show difficult. A final episode was added on 3 April 2020 to conclude the show.

Season 2
In season 2, the trip competition is between two groups of celebrities or several individual celebrities. The winner is chosen based on votes tally from the celebrities (main mc, special mc and trip planners).

History of audiences' votes and special segment (Season 1, Episode 1 to 158)

From episode 1 to 6, the winning team will be decided by the popularity votes from the 100 audiences. Each audience can only decide on supporting one team.

From episode 7 onward, the winning team will still be decided by the popularity votes from the 100 audiences but giving the 100 audiences the choices to support either one team or both.

Exception on audiences' votes
In episodes 21, 22, 39, 83, 84, 87, 88, 131, 132, 139 – 140 and 153 – 156, there are no voting from an audience of 100. These are educational trips for special historical events or informative purposes.

In episodes 42 – 45, 65 – 67, 91 – 93 and 100 – 103, as each team travelled 2 or more locations for the same battle theme, the overall winning team was decided after adding the total votes of both trips or locations (i.e. each team can get more than 100 votes).

In episodes 74 – 77, there is no voting from an audience of 100 due to the labour union strike and no audiences are invited to the show.

In episodes 116 – 119, there is no voting from an audience of 100. Instead, Lovelyz (Jiae, Jisoo, Ryu Su-jeong, Yein) and Pentagon (Hui, Hongseok, Shinwon, Yeo One) are the 8 special judges for the special theme. These 8 special judges can only pick one team each. In the event of a tie, Kim Sook will decide the winning team.

In episodes 127 – 130, Lee Hwi-jae and Kim Sook will be the special judges for The Solo Trip Special. There are four themes (essential courses, essential menus, bucket list and hidden courses) and the special judges will vote one country each for every theme. Trip designers who got chosen by the special judges will get extra five points on top of the popularity votes from the 100 audiences.

In episodes 137 – 138, there is no voting from an audience of 100. The 3 hosts made a bet to see whose trip people like the most via the social media and the one with the lowest number of votes will buy some snacks. Sung Si-kyung got the most votes and followed by Lee Hwi-jae and Kim Sook. Kim Sook bought cream buns for the 100 audiences in episode 141.

 Special segment: Battle Trip Awards (2018)

A year-closing episode, Battle Trip Awards, was shown on 29 December 2018 in episode 122. In this end of the year episode, the hosts will introduce recommended vacation spots for 2019 and show some unseen footages of some of the episodes in 2018. The Battle Trip Awards ceremony presents the Hottest Issue Clip Award (hottest issue on the internet) and The Best Trip Location Award (trip designer that received the most votes). Winners of the award are presented with a trophy.

Slogan

These slogans are used before the revamped of the program in Season 1, between episode 1 and 158. These slogans are again used in Season 2.
Opening Slogan:
'여행도 전쟁이다 배틀 트립' (Travelling is like a battle. Battle Trip!)
Ending Slogan:
'세상이 학교다 인생이 여행이다 배틀 트립' (The world is your school, and life is a trip. Battle trip!)

Airtime

Season 1

Season 2

Cast

Main MC

Season 1

Season 2

Special MC

Season 1
San E has stepped down from the show after the episode 47 on 22 April 2017. Since then, the show would invite celebrity guest as Special MC to host the show together with the cast.

Season 2

Episodes

Season 1

 Team Green
 Team Red

2016

2017

2018

2019

New program concept
New presentation concept after the program is being revamped.

2020

Season 2

2022

2023

Top 10 destinations as chosen by audience votes (Season 1, Episode 1 to 158)
Below is the list of destinations chosen by audiences' votes. Episodes with exceptions are not included in the list.

Ratings

Season 1
From 8 September 2018 onward, the show will be aired in two parts. Only the higher rating of the episode will be shown.

2016

2017

2018

2019

2020

Season 2
2022

2023

Books
 Written by KBS Battle Trip Production Team & Woo Ji-kyung

Awards and nominations

Notes

References

External links
  
  
 

2016 South Korean television series debuts
Korean-language television shows
Korean Broadcasting System original programming
South Korean variety television shows
South Korean travel television series
Television series impacted by the COVID-19 pandemic